Vera Vasilyevna Korsakova (17 October 1920 – November 2022) was a Soviet-Russian politician. A member of the Communist Party, she served in the Supreme Soviet of the Russian SFSR from 1959 to 1963.

Korsakova died in November 2022, at the age of 102.

References

1920 births
2022 deaths
20th-century Russian women politicians
People from Smolensk Governorate
Members of the Supreme Soviet of the Russian Soviet Federative Socialist Republic, 1959–1963
Heroes of Socialist Labour
Recipients of the Order of Lenin
Leatherworkers
Russian centenarians
Soviet women in politics
Women centenarians